2016 Labour Party leadership election may refer to:

2016 Labour Party (Netherlands) leadership election
2016 Labour Party leadership election (Ireland)
2016 Labour Party leadership election (UK)
Endorsements in the 2016 Labour Party leadership election (UK)